Matt Morgan (born 1976) is an American actor, politician, former basketball player and retired professional wrestler.

Matt Morgan or Matthew Morgan may also refer to:

 Matt Morgan (basketball) (born 1997), American basketball player
 Matt Morgan (comedian) (born 1977), English comedian
 Matt Morgan (cartoonist) (1837–1890), editorial cartoonist
 Matt Morgan (American football) (born 1980), American football player
 Matthew Morgan (rugby union) (born 1992), Welsh rugby union footballer
 Matthew Morgan (MP), member of parliament for Brecon
 Matthew Morgan (politician), member of the Maryland House of Delegates
 Matthew Morgan (author) (born 1978), author of Minor Miner (2020)
 Matthew Morgan (Dark Shadows), a fictional character form the Dark Shadows franchise